Ctenomedes is a monotypic snout moth genus. Its only species, Ctenomedes neuractis, is found in India. Both the genus and species were first described by Edward Meyrick in 1935.

References

Phycitini
Pyralidae genera
Monotypic moth genera